Waverly Bernard Woodson Jr. (August 3, 1922 – August 12, 2005) was an American staff sergeant and health professional. He is best known for his heroic actions as a combat medic during the Battle of Normandy in World War II.

Life and military service 

Waverly Bernard Woodson Jr. was born on August 3, 1922, in Philadelphia, Pennsylvania. After graduating from Overbrook High School, he began studying at Lincoln University in Oxford, Pennsylvania, where he was a pre-med student.

After the entry of the United States into World War II, Woodson - then in his second year - put his studies on hold, enlisting in the United States Army on December 15, 1942, alongside his younger brother Eugene. After scoring highly on a test, he joined the Anti-Aircraft Artillery Officer Candidate School, where he was one of only two African Americans. Before completing the course, Woodson was informed that there were no officer positions available for him due to his race. As a result, he was trained as a combat medic and assigned to the 320th Barrage Balloon Battalion. Woodson underwent training at Camp Tyson, the United States' barrage balloon training center in Paris, Tennessee, where he experienced segregation and discrimination. By the time of Operation Overlord, he held the rank of corporal.

On June 6, 1944, the 320th Barrage Balloon Battalion participated in the Battle of Normandy as part of the First United States Army; it was the only African American battalion to participate. Due to his training as a medic, Woodson was detached from the 320th and assigned to a landing craft tank (LCT) that was to land at Normandy in the early morning. While coming ashore at Omaha Beach as part of the third wave, Woodson's LCT hit a naval mine and lost power, drifting ashore with the tide. While drifting, the LCT was hit by an "eighty-eight" shell and Woodson suffered shrapnel injuries to his groin, inner thigh, and back. Upon reaching the shore and having his wounds treated, Woodson and other medics set up a field dressing station and began treating other wounded soldiers. Woodson worked continuously from 10:00 AM until 4:00 PM on the following day. During the 30 hours, he carried out procedures including setting limbs, removing bullets, amputating a foot, and dispensing plasma. After being relieved, Woodson was collecting bedding when he was alerted to three British soldiers having been submerged while leaving their LCT; Woodson provided artificial respiration to the three men, reviving them. Woodson was subsequently hospitalized due to his wounds; after three days on a hospital ship he requested to return to the front. It has been estimated that Woodson's actions saved the lives of as many as 200 soldiers, both black and white. Woodson's commanding officer recommended him for a Distinguished Service Cross for his actions, but the office of general John C. H. Lee determined that Woodson's actions warranted the greater honor of a Medal of Honor. United States Department of War special assistant to the director Philleo Nash proposed that President Franklin D. Roosevelt should give Woodson an award personally. Woodson ultimately received a Bronze Star Medal along with a Purple Heart. The Philadelphia Tribune wrote, "the feeling is prevalent among Negroes that had Woodson been of another race the highest honor [a Medal of Honor] would have been granted him."

Shortly after the Battle of Normandy, the 320th Barrage Balloon Battalion was redeployed to the United States, where it served on bases in Georgia followed by Hawaii. Upon the end of World War II in 1945, Woodson was moved to the United States Army Reserve. He initially hoped to study medicine, but was unable to find a medical school that would admit him as an African American. He went on to complete his studies at Lincoln University, graduating in 1950 with a degree in biology. Woodson was reactivated by the Army upon the outbreak of the Korean War that same year. He was initially assigned to train combat medics at Fort Benning in Georgia before being reassigned to running an Army morgue. He served in the United Kingdom, France, and the Asia-Pacific. Within the United States, he also served at Fort Meade, Valley Forge General Hospital, the Communicable Disease Center, and Walter Reed Army Medical Center. Woodson left the Army in 1952 with a final rank of staff sergeant.

Woodson married Joann Katharyne Snowden in 1952; the couple had two daughters and a son.

After leaving the Army, Woodson went on to work in the Bacteriology Department of the National Naval Medical Center. In 1959, he began working in the Clinical Pathology Department of the National Institutes of Health where he supervised the staffing and operation of operating theaters until retiring in 1980.

In 1994, Woodson was one of three veterans invited to visit Normandy by the Government of France to commemorate the 50th anniversary of the D-Day landings. He was presented with a commemorative medallion.

Woodson died on August 12, 2005, in the Wilson Health Care Center in Gaithersburg, Maryland at the age of 83. He was buried with military honors in Arlington National Cemetery. His papers were donated to his alma mater, Lincoln University.

Awards and decorations 
Woodson received the following awards and decorations:

 American Campaign Medal 
 Asiatic–Pacific Campaign Medal
 Bronze Star Medal
 European–African–Middle Eastern Campaign Medal with Arrowhead device and two Bronze Stars
 Good Conduct Medal 
 Korean Service Medal
 National Defense Service Medal
 Purple Heart
 United Nations Medal
 World War II Victory Medal

Legacy 
Despite his acknowledged heroism, Woodson did not receive the Medal of Honor. This has been attributed to racial discrimination and to the National Personnel Records Center fire in 1973 that destroyed around 80% of the Army's personnel records. In September 2020, United States Senator Chris Van Hollen (D-Md.) introduced bill S.4535: "A bill to authorize the President to award the Medal of Honor to Waverly B. Woodson, Jr., for acts of valor during World War II". An equivalent bill, H.R.8194, was also introduced in the United States House of Representatives by David Trone (R-Md.). Woodson's widow Joann has announced that, if Woodson was posthumously awarded the Medal of Honor, she would donate it to the National Museum of African American History and Culture. In June 2021, Commanding General of the First United States Army Thomas S. James Jr. wrote in favor of Woodson receiving the Medal of Honor.

In April 2022, the Rock Island Arsenal Health Clinic in Rock Island Arsenal, Illinois was renamed the Woodson Health Clinic in honor of Woodson. Woodson's son Stephen attended a ceremony to mark the renaming where he unveiled a portrait of Woodson.

Author Alan Gratz based the character Henry Allen in his 2019 novel Allies on Woodson.

References 

1922 births
2005 deaths
African-American United States Army personnel
African Americans in World War II
United States Army personnel of World War II
Burials at Arlington National Cemetery
Centers for Disease Control and Prevention people
Combat medics
Lincoln University (Pennsylvania) alumni
National Institutes of Health people
People from Philadelphia
United States Army non-commissioned officers
Walter Reed Army Medical Center